Extreme Chef is a reality competition television program on Food Network. It first aired on June 26, 2011, and is hosted by Marsh Mokhtari. The second season premiered on August 16, 2012.

Format
Seven chefs test their culinary abilities, as well as their physical prowess and mental toughness. The challenges are judged by a rotating panel of judges. The winner takes home the $50,000 grand prize.

Episodes

Season 1

Season 2

References

External links

2010s American reality television series
2011 American television series debuts
Food Network original programming
English-language television shows
2012 American television series endings